Mehr Khowshan (also Romanized as Mehr Khowshān; also known as Mahr Rakhshān, Mahr Rakshān, Mehr Bakhshān, Mehr Jūshān, Mehr Rakhshān, and Mehr Rākīshān) is a village in Dar Agah Rural District, in the Central District of Hajjiabad County, Hormozgan Province, Iran. At the 2006 census, its population was 10, in 5 families.

References 

Populated places in Hajjiabad County